The 2018–19 season was Football Club Internazionale Milano's 110th in existence and 103rd consecutive season in the top flight of Italian football. The side competed in Serie A, the Coppa Italia, the UEFA Champions League and the UEFA Europa League.

Kits

Season overview

On 20 May 2018, in the final round of 2017–18 Serie A, Inter beat Lazio 3–2 at Stadio Olimpico, which qualified them for the UEFA Champions League after a six-year absence. Later, in pre-season summer friendlies, Inter finished third place in 2018 International Champions Cup.

During the summer transfer window, Inter bought Radja Nainggolan from Roma and Lautaro Martínez from Racing Club, also signing Stefan de Vrij and Kwadwo Asamoah as free agents. Due to restrictions of Financial Fair Play Regulations, Inter cannot spend too much on transfer market. Thus, some new players are transferred via "loan with option to buy", including Matteo Politano from Sassuolo, Šime Vrsaljko from Atlético Madrid and Keita Baldé from AS Monaco. On 14 August 2018, club manager Luciano Spalletti signed a new contract to keep him at the club for the next three seasons, until 2021.

On 3 September 2018, Inter announced their squad list for 2018–19 UEFA Champions League group stage.

Internazionale completed a double over arch-rivals A.C. Milan. On 21 October 2018, a late Mauro Icardi strike assured Inter of a 1–0 victory over Milan. Icardi headed a Matias Vecino cross into an empty net, between A.C. Milan centre-backs Alessio Romagnoli and Mateo Musacchio into an empty net goalkeeper Gianluigi Donnarumma had abandoned to catch the cross. This was after both teams had goals disallowed in the first half, but ended a highly defensive second half. On 17 March 2019, Vecino half volleyed in a goal after Martinez assisted, a Perisic cross having found the Argentine. Inter made it two after Stefan De Vrij headed in a Matteo Politano cross from a short Inter Milan corner and the win was sealed after Politano went down in the Milan penalty area following a debatable foul by Milan winger Samu Castillejo. Martinez stepped up to score the resulting penalty kick. A Tiémoué Bakayoko header from a Hakan Calhanoglu free-kick and a Musacchio header from a Milan short corner were not enough for Inter's arch rivals and Inter completed the first league double in the Milan derby in a while.

Among Inter's other great victories were two thrashings of Genoa, a 5-0 thumping on 3 November 2018 and a 4-0 crushing on 3 April 2019. Inter's victory in November featured two outstanding performances from Roberto Gagliardini and Joao Mario, the former of whom scored two goals and the latter of whom assisted three goals and scored one himself. Gagliardini drew first blood for the hosts by pouncing on a loose ball, and two minutes later on 16 minutes Inter doubled their lead through Matteo Politano who finished an inviting pass from Mario, one-on-one with goalkeeper Ionuț Radu who watched the ball roll past him into the centre-right of the net. Radu spent the season at Genoa on loan from Inter Milan and transferred to the Genoese outfit permanently at the end of the season, in a solid campaign for the Romanian which was one of the bright sparks of an unnerving season for Genoa. A long throw at the start of the second half allowed Gagliardini to score his second goal via a Radu save following a Perisic shot. Mario scored in injury time to make the scoreline very convincing, a fine finish from just inside the penalty area after receiving the ball from Keita Balde. Mario grabbed his hat-trick of assists deep into injury time by setting up Radja Nainggolan who marked his return from injury with a goal. The scoreline was very representative of a game in which Inter dominated and had most of the chances and were rewarded with a high number of goals.

Inter's visit to Genoa later in the season was again a good affair for the Nerazzuri. Gagliardini scored two again, the first after 15 minutes finishing a Kwadwo Asamoah cross after Perisic dummies the ball through to Gagliardini who in the centre right of the area tucked into the centre right of the goal. The goal was created by Matteo Politano's dribble down the left wing of the pitch. Genoa defender Cristian Romero was sent off on 39 minutes, receiving a red card for throwing Mauro Icardi to the floor, on the night of his first game since a fallout between Icardi's agent (and wife) and Inter Milan chiefs with the striker apparently desiring a transfer move in the summer, ideally to Real Madrid, though there were links of Icardi with Chelsea, which saw Icardi miss much of the season, in the penalty area. Icardi scored the resulting penalty to double Inter's lead and this began a more amicable relationship between player and club. Perisic's finish near the right-hand bottom corner of the goal from a one-two with Icardi made it three in the second half and with ten minutes to spare despite Radu's block of a Gagliardini header from a Perisic corner was judged to have crossed the line by goal-line technology, giving the Italian central midfielder his second goal of the night. It was another match Inter gloriously dominated.

Inter engulfed victories over A.C. Milan and Genoa in November inside a seven-game winning run, with defeat of Milan the fifth win on the trot in the league and victory over Genoa the seventh. Inter beat Sampdoria 1–0, Fiorentina 2–1, Cagliari 2–0, SPAL 2–1,A.C. Milan 1–0, Lazio 3–0 in another notable season's accomplishment, and Genoa 5-0 on this run of form. An Icardi double and a Brozovic goal were enough to ensure the win over Lazio, a game in which Inter goalkeeper Samir Handanovic was outstanding.

Inter otherwise went through a season of highs and lows. Early on in the season, Inter looked like they could bid for the title after the seven-game winning run left them few points behind Juventus and roughly level on points with Napoli. Following several draws and losses and a poor start to the year 2019, which first saw a win in February, courtesy of Martinez's winner at Parma, Inter dropped out of the title race, and spent the rest of the season challenging for a place in the 2019-20 UEFA Champions League group stage. A 1–0 victory over Napoli with Martinez nabbing the winner after Kalidou Koulibaly and Lorenzo Insigne were sent off for the Neapolitan side was retaliated for by a 4-1 thrashing in Naples which left Inter Milan leaving it until the last day of the season to secure a place in the UEFA Champions League for the 2019–20 season. Keita Balde's goal seemed to see Inter smoothly progress into the tournament of the European football elite, but an equaliser from opponents Empoli meant Inter's hopes were on a knife edge as Milan and Atalanta were winning their matches. A dramatic Nainggolan winner sent the San Siro into euphoria as Inter assured themselves of a Champions League place, though in the tense atmosphere, Inter (Keita Balde) and Empoli had players sent off before the match ended. The match condemned Empoli to relegation to Serie B. It, however, secured a Champions League place for Inter. It was a satisfactory season for the Nerazzuri, as relievingly Inter stayed at the same level as the season before but did not kick on as expected and so were a bit disappointing.

Inter fared poorly in the Coppa Italia, knocked out in their second match of the tournament by Lazio on penalties.

Inter Milan were unlucky to be knocked out in the group stages of the Champions League. Inter started their campaign by defeating Tottenham 2-1 after a great comeback including a late Vecino winner and then PSV Eindhoven were beaten 2-1 too in a nervy match. Defeat at Barcelona, though, was not followed well, as a draw against Barcelona, defeat to Tottenham and a draw with PSV allowed Tottenham's draw against Barcelona to see the eventual finalists of the season's competition through to the next round at the expense of Inter. In the defeat at Barcelona, Marcelo Brozovic's slide to the floor to block a Lionel Messi free-kick became a popular meme on social media due to the unusual nature of the tactic.

The Europa league also proved disappointing. Inter thrashed Rapid Vienna 5-0 on aggregate to progress to the round of 16 after being demoted as third-place in their Champions League group to the Europa League. They were beaten by Eintracht Frankfurt, though, because of a Luka Jovic goal at the San Siro.

Inter did, though, hold themselves up well and maintained progress, and so can be judged to have had a successful enough season. However, towards the end of the campaign, manager Luciano Spalletti was sacked and replaced by former Juventus, Italy and Chelsea managed Antonio Conte, owing to the club's desire to progress further than they had done this season.

Players

Squad information

Note: Serie A imposes a cap on the first team squad at 25 players, with additional requirements on homegrown players (marked as HG) and club-trained players (marked as CT). However, league rules allow for unlimited club-trained players that are under-21 (marked as U21).

Due to the aforementioned reason, Inter only registered a 21-man squad for domestic competition, so Tommaso Berni was excluded. However, Berni can be re-registered by the club as a replacement for any injured goalkeepers. Inter also registered a different squad for European competition, which included goalkeeper Raffaele Di Gennaro, but excluded several players.

Transfers

In

Other acquisitions

Out

Other disposals

Pre-season and friendlies

International Champions Cup

Competitions

Serie A

League table

Results summary

Results by round

Matches

Coppa Italia

UEFA Champions League

Group stage

UEFA Europa League

Knockout phase

Round of 32

Round of 16

Statistics

Appearances and goals

|-
! colspan=14 style="background:#dcdcdc; text-align:center| Goalkeepers

|-
! colspan=14 style="background:#dcdcdc; text-align:center| Defenders

|-
! colspan=14 style="background:#dcdcdc; text-align:center| Midfielders

|-
! colspan=14 style="background:#dcdcdc; text-align:center| Forwards

|-
! colspan=14 style="background:#dcdcdc; text-align:center| Players transferred out during the season

Goalscorers

Last updated: 26 May 2019

Clean sheets

Last updated: 13 May 2019

Disciplinary record

Last updated: 26 May 2019

References

Inter Milan seasons
Internazionale
Internazionale